IAU may refer to:
Immersion gold plating (IAu), a surface finish process in PCB manufacturing
International Astronomical Union
International American University
International American University College of Medicine
International Association of Universities
International Association of Ultrarunners (IAU) is the governing body for ultra running
Islamic American University
Islamic Azad University
Italian Actors Union, former name of the Guild of Italian American Actors, United States
5000 IAU, an asteroid
Is Anyone Up?
International Crossbow Shooting Union or International Armbrustschützen Union (IAU)
Interamerican University of Puerto Rico

Iau is:
The Iau language
An occasional spelling for Eiao